The 2022 Sam Houston Bearkats football team represented Sam Houston State University as a member of the Western Athletic Conference (WAC) during the 2022 NCAA Division I FCS football season. Led by ninth-year head coach K. C. Keeler, the Bearkats compiled an overall record of 5–4. Sam Houston played home games at Bowers Stadium in Huntsville, Texas.

The 2022 season was the program's last season as a member of the WAC as the Bearkats will join Conference USA in 2023.

Schedule
Sam Houston and the WAC announced the 2022 football schedule on January 12, 2022.

Personnel

Roster

References

Sam Houston
Sam Houston Bearkats football seasons
Sam Houston Bearkats football